Martha Daunke (November 1899 – 1967) was a German chess player. She was a participant the Women's World Chess Championship 1927.

Biography
In 1927, Martha Daunke participated in first Women's World Chess Championship where she ranked 12th place. In 1939, Martha Daunke was participant the first German Women's Chess Championship in Stuttgart where she ranked 5th place. In 1943, she ranked 6th in German Women's Chess Championship.

After World War II Martha Daunke participated in East German Women's Chess Championship which best result has achieved in Soviet occupation zone Women's Chess Championship in 1948 in Bad Doberan where she shared 1st place and only in additional match lost to Gertrud Nüsken. She participated in East German Women's Chess Championships by the end of the 1950s.

References

External links

1899 births
1967 deaths
Sportspeople from Wrocław
German female chess players
20th-century chess players